Zoi or ZOI may refer to:
 Zero one infinity rule, rule of thumb in software design
 Zoi (city), or Hezuo, city in Gansu, China
 Zone of influence, see High Voltage Isolation and Ground Potential Rise

See also
 Zoe (disambiguation)